Early parliamentary elections were held in Bulgaria on 2 October 2022 to elect members of the 48th National Assembly. The snap election was called after the fall of the Petkov Government, a four-party coalition, in June 2022. This was the fourth parliamentary election since 2021, an unprecedented situation in Bulgarian history, the previous elections being the April, July, and November 2021 elections.

As in the previous snap elections, no party secured a majority. The GERB-SDS won a plurality of 67 seats and was assigned the task by President Rumen Radev of forming a government, but their efforts failed. The president shortly after granted the We Continue the Change party and later the BSP for Bulgaria coalition a mandate to form a government, but both were unsuccessful. As a result, President Radev scheduled another parliamentary election, the fifth in two years, to take place on 2 April 2023.

Background

The 2021 Bulgarian general election in November saw We Continue the Change (PP) achieve a surprise victory, receiving 25% of the vote. Led by Kiril Petkov and Asen Vasilev, the PP formed a coalition government with BSP for Bulgaria (BSPzB), There Is Such a People (ITN) and Democratic Bulgaria (DB). This broke the deadlock that had arisen as a result of the previous two parliamentary elections, after which no party was able to form a government.

On 8 June 2022, ITN withdrew from the government, citing disagreements over the state budget, fiscal policy and the lifting of Bulgaria's veto on opening EU accession talks with North Macedonia. On 22 June, the government was defeated in a no confidence vote tabled by GERB and supported by DPS, ITN and Revival.

Electoral system
The 240 members of the National Assembly are elected by open list proportional representation from 31 multi-member constituencies ranging in size from 4 to 16 seats. The electoral threshold is 4% for parties, with seats allocated according to the largest remainder method.

Political groups 

The table below lists the political party groups represented in the 47th National Assembly.

Competing parties

Opinion polls
Graphical representation of recalculated data

The opinion poll results below were recalculated from the original data and exclude polls that chose "I will not vote" or "I am uncertain" options.

Results

Voter demographics
Alpha Research exit polling suggested the following demographic breakdown. The parties that got below 4% of the vote are included in "Others".

By constituency

Aftermath and coalition formation 
As per the Bulgarian Constitution, the Bulgarian President Rumen Radev is required to hand a mandate for government formation to the largest party. If they don't propose a government within seven days, or if that government is rejected by the Bulgarian Parliament, President Radev will hand the second mandate to the second largest party. If the second mandate doesn't produce a government, the president can grant a third mandate to a party of his choice. If no government is approved by Parlianemt after all three mandates have been returned, new elections will be scheduled. Neither GERB nor PP, the first and second largest party respectively, are expected to be able to form a stable government.

Following the election, GERB leader Boyko Borisov, who had served as prime minister for most of the time between 2009 and 2021, announced that he was not interested in a cabinet position or returning to the post of prime minister, stating that "now is not the right time for dominance, but for seeking unity." Borisov's previous government had been the subject of the 2020–2021 Bulgarian protests over corruption allegations, the effects of which had been felt through all of the legislative snap elections held since that point. He stated that GERB was open to coalition talks with any party or coalition in the legislature, even ones that had generally opposed him and GERB, and sought party experts to seek common ground on main issues, including the ongoing Russian invasion of Ukraine, the 2021–2022 inflation surge, joining the eurozone, and becoming part of the Schengen Area.

The new parliament, which remains fragmented, could result in a further unprecedented fourth snap election should coalition formation fail. Bulgarian Rise and Revival, which hold a combined 39 seats, are considered Eurosceptic and sympathetic to Russia, similarly to the Bulgarian Socialist Party with 25 seats. GERB and the Movement for Rights and Freedoms do not have a majority, holding only 103 of the 121 seats needed. Although generally Pro-EU, the remaining parties and alliances with seats have opposed Borisov's past government and have reportedly refused any possibility of a coalition with GERB.

On 18 October, Borisov announced that his attempts to broker a coalition government prior to the first sitting of the new Assembly were unsuccessful. The following day, the Assembly failed to elect a speaker during its first meeting, the first time this has ever occurred. After multiple failed attempts, upon being nominated by Korneliya Ninova as a consensus candidate, the Assembly elected its oldest member, GERB MP Vezhdi Rashidov, as chairman on 21 October.

The gridlock to form a new government persisted throughout October and November 2022 and before a first or second mandate was given, President Rumen Radev stated that he would delay handing over the third mandate for government formation until after the New Year so as to delay elections until March 2023 and avoid the most difficult winter period. On 2 December, President Rumen Radev stated that he would hand the government mandate to the election's winner GERB the following Monday. On 5 December, Rumen Radev granted the first mandate to GERB's nominee, Nikolay Gabrovski. One week later, on 12 December, Gabrovski proposed a new government. His prime ministership was rejected by Parliament (113 "for", 125 "against", 2 absent) two days later on 14 December, with only MPs from the DPS and BV voting in favour alongside GERB. Congruent with the law, the second mandate was handed to PP, which returned the mandate on 9 January 2023, after failing to pass a declaration of intent in parliament three days prior. In the third and last attempt to form a government, before a snap election has to be called, President Radev chose to hand the mandate to the BSPzB coalition on 16 January. The BSPzB's attempt was unsuccessful, prompting President Radev to schedule a fifth election in two years for 2 April 2023.

References

Bulgaria
Parliamentary election
Bulgaria
Parliamentary elections in Bulgaria